The Prophet-5 is an analog synthesizer manufactured by the American company Sequential. It was designed by Dave Smith and John Bowen in 1977, who used microprocessors, then a new technology, to create the first polyphonic synthesizer with fully programmable memory. This allowed users to store sounds and recall them instantly rather than having to reprogram them manually; whereas synthesizers had once created unpredictable sounds, the Prophet-5 moved synthesizers to producing "a standard package of familiar sounds". 

Between 1978 and 1984, about 6,000 units were produced across three revisions. In 1981, Sequential released a 10-voice, double-keyboard version, the Prophet-10. Sequential introduced new versions in 2020, and it has been emulated in software synthesizers and hardware. The Prophet-5 has been widely used in popular music and film soundtracks.

Development

The Prophet-5 was created in 1977 by Dave Smith and John Bowen at Sequential Circuits. At the time, Smith had a full-time job working with microprocessors, then a new technology. Smith conceived the idea of combining them with synthesizer chips to create a programmable synthesizer; this would allow users to save sounds to memory, rather than having to recreate them manually. He did not pursue the idea, assuming Moog or ARP would design the instrument first. When no instrument emerged, in early 1977, Smith quit his job to work full-time on the idea.

Initially, Smith and Bowen developed the Prophet-10, a synthesizer with ten voices of polyphony; however, it was unstable and quickly overheated, creating tuning problems. Smith and Bowen removed half the electronics, reducing the voices to five and creating the Prophet-5. Smith demonstrated the Prophet-5 at NAMM in January 1978 and shipped the first models later that year.

Production 
Three versions were built between 1978 and 1984. The first, Revision 1, was hand-assembled and produced quickly to generate initial revenue; only 182 were made. Revision 2 was mass-produced in quantities over 1,000; this model was more robust, added cassette patch storage, and replaced the koa wood casing with walnut. Revision 3 replaced the Solid State Music (SSM) chipset with Curtis Electro music Specialties (CEM) chips, necessitating a major redesign. According to Sound on Sound, Revision 3 "remained impressive and pleasant to play, but was slightly cold and featureless by comparison to earlier models". In all, approximately 6,000 Prophet-5 synthesizers were produced.

In 1981, Sequential Circuits released the Prophet-10, featuring 10 voices, 20 oscillators, and a double manual keyboard. Like the Prophet-5 Revision 3, it uses CEM chips. The first Prophet-10s used an Exatron Stringy Floppy drive for saving patches and storing sequencer data. Sequential later moved to a Braemar tape drive, which was more reliable and could store about four times as many sequencer events. In 2020, Sequential reissued the Prophet-5 along with a new version of the Prophet-10, the Rev 4.

Features
Early Prophet-5s use voltage-controlled oscillator (VCO), filter and amplifier chips designed by E-mu Systems and manufactured by Solid State Music (SSM). Revision 3 Prophet-5s used Curtis CEM chips manufactured by Curtis Electromusic Specialties. Some owners maintain that SSM oscillators produce a richer timbre. However, the SSM oscillators rendered the instruments unstable and prone to detuning over time. CEM chips have remained more stable.

Unlike its nearest competitor in the 1970s, the Yamaha CS-80, the Prophet-5 has patch memory, allowing users to store sounds rather than having to reprogram them manually. It has a proprietary serial interface that allows the user to play using the Prophet Remote, a sling-style keytar controller; the interface cannot connect the Prophet-5 to other devices. Sequential produced a MIDI interface that could be retrofitted to later Prophet-5 models. Third-party MIDI interfaces have also been offered.

Impact 
Before the Prophet-5, synthesizers required users to adjust cables and knobs to change sounds, with no guarantee of exactly recreating a sound. The Prophet-5, with its ability to save sounds to patch memory, facilitated a move from synthesizers creating unpredictable sounds to producing "a standard package of familiar sounds". According to MusicRadar, the Prophet-5 "changed the world – simple as that".

The Prophet-5 became a market leader and industry standard. The Cars keyboardist Greg Hawkes used the Prophet-5 for the band's hits "Let's Go" (1979) and "Shake It Up" (1981). Kraftwerk used it on their 1981 "Computer World" Tour. David Sylvian used it on Japan's 1982 hit single "Ghosts" and Richard Barbieri of the same band has used it frequently. Michael Jackson used it extensively on Thriller (1982), and Madonna used it on Like a Virgin (1984). Peter Gabriel considered the Prophet-5 his "old warhorse" synthesizer, using it for many sounds on his 1986 album So. Brad Fiedel used a Prophet-10 to record the soundtrack for The Terminator (1984), and the filmmaker John Carpenter used both the Prophet-5 and Prophet-10 extensively for his soundtracks. The Greek composer Vangelis used the Prophet-5 and the Prophet-10, the latter for example in the soundtrack of Blade Runner (1982). 

The Prophet-5 was widely used by 1980s synth pop acts such as Orchestral Manoeuvres in the Dark, Tears for Fears, Thompson Twins, Thomas Dolby, Devo, Eurythmics, Soft Cell, Vince Clarke and Pet Shop Boys. Radiohead used the Prophet-5 on their 2000 album Kid A, such as on the song "Everything In Its Right Place". Other users include Giorgio Moroder, Tony Banks, Phil Collins, Tangerine Dream, Jean-Michel Jarre, Dr. Dre,  Richard Wright, Rick Wakeman, Pendulum, BT, and John Harrison.

Successors and emulations

Smith released several further instruments with the Prophet name, including synthesizers like the Pro-One, the Prophet VS, the Prophet '08 and the Prophet-6 and samplers such as the Prophet 2000 and the Prophet 3000. In 2020, Sequential announced a new version of the Prophet-5, the Rev 4. It adds features including USB and MIDI connectivity, velocity and aftertouch sensitivity, polyphonic glide, and two sets of filters. Sequential also announced a new Prophet-10, initially released as a ten-voice single manual monotimbral version of the Rev 4. 

Bowen provided consultation for Native Instruments during the development of the Pro 5 software synthesizer emulation, released in 1999. It was followed by the Pro 52 in 2000 and the Pro 53 in 2003. Bowen also provided consultation for Creamware for their 2003 software emulations, the Prophet and Prophet Plus. Arturia released another emulation, the Prophet V, in 2006. In 2018, U-he released the Repro-5. Third parties have created clones of the Prophet-5, such as PikoPiko Factory's open source synthesizer, the Profree-4 in 2022 and Behringer's Pro-16 in 2021.

References

Further reading

External links

Prophet-5 profile on Vintage Synth Explorer

Products introduced in 1978
Sequential Circuits synthesizers
Analog synthesizers
Polyphonic synthesizers
Z80